The , in what was then Tacoma, Washington's Japantown, was one of 24 Japanese language schools that existed in Washington prior to World War II.

History
The building was built in 1922 to replace a smaller building and accommodate a larger enrollment. It was designed by Frederick Heath of Heath, Gove and Bell. Because Washington had laws preventing aliens from owning land, the lot was paid for by a school corporation that was made up of three Americans, and two Issei Japanese Americans. Two lots were bought for a total cost of $1,600, and the building was built at a cost of $9,000. An addition to the building was added in 1926.  The school taught classes on the English language, the Japanese language, and Japanese culture. 

During World War II the building was used to gather Japanese residents during World War II, before sending them to internment camps. 

The University of Washington bought the building in 1993 after it established a campus in Tacoma. By this point, the decades of vacancy had left the building quite dilapidated. The same year, the university had made a request to the Tacoma Landmarks Preservation Commission for permission to demolish the building and replace it with a commemorative garden, but failed to act on their approval. In 2001, the City of Tacoma told the university that the building was a safety hazard and the following year the Preservation Commission renewed their approval of the plan for demolition. The university received an estimate of $3 million to rehabilitate the building, and decided that the cost was not feasible.

Despite being listed on the National Register of Historic Places, as well as being a City of Tacoma Landmark, the building was demolished in 2004 after having stood vacant since the 1940s. Prior to its demolishing, the school was one of only two Japanese language schools left, of around four dozen that existed in the Western United States and Hawaii.

See also

Japanese language education in the United States
History of the Japanese in Seattle

References

Sources
 Asato, Noriko (2006). Teaching Mikadoism: The Attack on Japanese Language Schools in Hawaii, California, and Washington, 1919-1927, Honolulu: University of Hawaii Press, .
 Magden, Ronald E. (1998). Furusato: Tacoma-Pierce County Japanese 1888-1988, Nikkeijinkai: Tacoma Japanese Community Service.
 Sandercock, Leonie (1998). Making the Invisible Visible: A Multicultural Planning History, University of California Press, .

Demolished buildings and structures in Washington (state)
Nihon Go Gakko
Japanese-American culture in Washington (state)
National Register of Historic Places in Tacoma, Washington
Schools in Tacoma, Washington
Supplementary Japanese schools in the United States
Japanese-American history
School buildings on the National Register of Historic Places in Washington (state)
Frederick Heath buildings
Buildings and structures demolished in 2004
Educational institutions established in 1922
University of Washington Tacoma
1922 establishments in Washington (state)